WMOA is a Class C radio station which broadcasts at 1490 kHz, with its signal originating from the city of Marietta, Ohio. The 1000-watt station covers much of the Mid-Ohio Valley, which includes parts of Southeastern Ohio and Northwestern West Virginia around the cities of Marietta and Parkersburg, West Virginia.

History
WMOA began broadcasting as an experimental station in September 1946 from a garage in Williamstown, West Virginia, across the Ohio River from Marietta. The station, upon receiving a Federal Communications Commission (FCC) license, relocated its broadcast studios to the basement of the historic Lafayette Hotel in downtown Marietta. The studios relocated again to the Citizen's Bank Building during the latter part of the 20th century before settling at their current location on Lancaster Street in Marietta.

Programming
The station currently advertises itself as "Local Radio" and features a variety of generally local interest broadcasting. The station is currently affiliated with ABC Radio for national news updates, and broadcasts live sporting events for nearby Marietta College. Besides ABC News updates twice hourly, the station features local on-air talent and Adult Contemporary music for the bulk of their broadcast day, The station primarily provides coverage of the Cincinnati Reds and Ohio State University football, but also airs Cleveland Cavaliers, Cincinnati Bengals, Cleveland Browns, Cleveland Indians, Ohio University Bobcats football, and local high school sports broadcasts.

External links

FM translator

Marietta, Ohio
MOA
Mainstream adult contemporary radio stations in the United States
Full service radio stations in the United States